Fyodor Ivanovich Tolbukhin (16 June 1894 – 17 October 1949) was a Soviet military commander and Marshal of the Soviet Union.

Early life and military career
Tolbukhin was born into a peasant family in the province of Yaroslavl, north-east of Moscow. He volunteered for the Imperial Army in 1914 at the outbreak of World War I. He was steadily promoted, advancing from private to captain by 1916. He was also decorated for bravery multiple times.

In August 1918 Tolbukhin joined the Red Army, where he served as the chief of staff of the 56th infantry division. After the Russian Civil War ended (1921), Tolbukhin was given a number of staff positions. He also attended the Frunze Military Academy for advanced staff training, graduating in 1931. In 1937, after a series of staff positions, Tolbukhin was given command of a division. In 1938, he was made chief of staff of the Transcaucasus Military District.

World War II

Tolbukhin remained in this position through the opening phases of Operation Barbarossa until August 1941, when he was made the chief of staff of the Crimean Front, which he held until March 1942. From May to July 1942, he was the assistant commander of the Stalingrad Military District. After that, he was the commander of the 57th Army until March 1943. The 57th was involved in the Battle of Stalingrad, where Tolbukhin's superior, Colonel-General Andrei Yeremenko, praised his command organization and military prowess. After his command of the 57th, Tolbukhin was placed in command of the Southern Front.

In October 1943 the Southern Front was renamed 4th Ukrainian Front. Tolbukhin assisted Rodion Malinovsky's 3rd Ukrainian Front in the Lower Dnieper Offensive and Dnieper–Carpathian Offensive. In May 1944, Tolbukhin was transferred to control of 3rd Ukrainian Front. During the Summer Campaign, from June to October 1944, Tolbukhin and Malinovsky launched their invasion of the Balkans and were able to conquer most of Romania. On September 12, 1944, two days after Malinovsky was promoted to Marshal of the Soviet Union, Tolbukhin was promoted to the same rank. While Malinovsky moved northwest, towards Hungary and Yugoslavia, Tolbukhin occupied Bulgaria. Starting in the Winter Campaign, Tolbukhin shifted his army to the northwest axis, thereby liberating much of Yugoslavia and invading southern Hungary.

In late April 1945, at the end of the battle of Vienna, Tolbukhin acted on Stalin's order to entrust Karl Renner with foundation of a new provisional Austrian government in order to prepare democratic elections. On 27 April, Renner was appointed provisional government leader, at Tolbukhin's authority, which renders the latter an important role in the foundation of a new Austrian republic that had been integrated into the Third Reich (1938-1945). Tolbukhin gave the go-ahead at the location, for this important step towards an independent Austria in the formation of the Second Republic (1945-present).

After the war, Tolbukhin was commander-in-chief of the Southern Group of Forces, which comprised the Balkan region. In January 1947, Tolbukhin was made the commander of the Transcaucasus Military District, a post he held until his death on October 17, 1949, due to complication from diabetes.

Tolbukhin is generally regarded as one of the finest Soviet generals of World War II. Meticulous, careful, and not overly ambitious like some Soviet commanders, Tolbukhin was well respected by fellow commanders and also his men, especially since he had a dedication to keeping casualty rates low. Tolbukhin was the recipient of numerous awards and medals including the highest Soviet medal and rank, the Order of Victory and Hero of the Soviet Union, respectively. Tolbukhin was also People's Hero of Yugoslavia, whose capital Belgrade he liberated. The urn containing his ashes is buried in the Kremlin Wall Necropolis, and there is a monument to him in his native Yaroslavl.

Honours and awards
 Hero of the Soviet Union (7 May 1965, posthumously)
 Order of Victory (№ 9–26 April 1945)
 Two Orders of Lenin (incl. 19 March 1944, 21 February 1945)
 Order of Red Banner, three times (18 October 1922, 3 November 1944)
 Order of Suvorov, 1st class, twice (28 January 1943, 16 May 1944)
 Order of Kutuzov, 1st class (17 September 1943)
 Order of the Red Star (22 February 1938)
 Order of St. Anna, 3rd class
 Order of St. Stanislaus, 3rd class
 Order of the People's Hero (Yugoslavia, 31 May 1945)
 Hero of the People's Republic of Bulgaria (1979, posthumous)
 Order of Bravery (Bulgaria)
 Order of Georgi Dimitrov (Bulgaria)
 Order of the "Hungarian freedom"
 Grand Cross of the Order of "The Republic of Hungary"
 Grand Officer of the Legion of Honour (France)
 Honorary Citizen of Sofia and Belgrade
 To the Valiant Soldier of the Karelian Front
 Medal "For the Defence of Stalingrad"
 Medal "For the Victory over Germany in the Great Patriotic War 1941–1945"
 Medal "For the Capture of Budapest"
 Medal "For the Capture of Vienna"
 Medal "In Commemoration of the 800th Anniversary of Moscow"
 Jubilee Medal "XX Years of the Workers' and Peasants' Red Army"
 Medal "For the Liberation of Belgrade"
 Jubilee Medal "30 Years of the Soviet Army and Navy"

Memorials
The Bulgarian city of Dobrich was renamed Tolbukhin, a name it held until the fall of communism in 1989.

In Ukraine a Prospect (street) in Odesa holds his name. In December 2022 the Fyodor Tolbukhin street in Kyiv was renamed to  street and the Fyodor Tolbukhin lane was renamed to Mykhailo Yalovy lane.

One of the main streets in Belgrade, the capital of Serbia, was named Marshal Tolbukhin Street (in Serbian: Улица маршала Толбухина / Ulica maršala Tolbuhina). The street was originally named Макензијева / Makenzijeva, after Scottish missionary Francis Mackenzie who purchased and developed this part of the city in the late 19th century. After the fall of Communism in Serbia and democratic changes in 2000, the name of the street was reverted to its original name. Instead, Goce Delčeva Street, in the new section of the city (New Belgrade) was renamed Boulevard of Marshal Tolbukhin (Булевар маршала Толбухина / Bulevar maršala Tolbuhina) in 2016.

Budapest, the capital of Hungary also had one of its streets named after Tolbukhin, as he was one of the major Soviet commanders in the Hungarian war theatre. The previous Mészáros utca (Butchers' Street) was renamed Vámház körút (Custom House Boulevard) during the (re)construction of the area in 1875. The road was renamed after the Tsar of Bulgaria, Ferdinand in 1915, when Bulgaria joined the Central Powers in the First World War. In 1919 the road got back its old name, Vámház körút, which it bore until 1942, when it was once more renamed, this time after son of Regent of Hungary, Admiral Miklós Horthy, István Horthy. In 1945, the road was named after Marshal Tolbukhin (Tolbuhin Boulevard), and it held this name until 1990 with the fall of communism.

A Monument to Fyodor Tolbukhin was installed in 1960 in Moscow in the square on Samotychnaya Street. The authors of the monument are the sculptor L. E. Kerbel and the architect G. A. Zakharov.

References

1894 births
1949 deaths
Deaths from diabetes
People from Yaroslavsky District, Yaroslavl Oblast
Marshals of the Soviet Union
Burials at the Kremlin Wall Necropolis
Soviet military personnel of World War II
Heroes of the Soviet Union
Recipients of the Order of Victory
Recipients of the Order of Suvorov, 1st class
Recipients of the Order of Lenin
Recipients of the Order of the Red Banner
Recipients of the Order of Kutuzov, 1st class
Recipients of the Order of Saint Stanislaus (Russian), 3rd class
Recipients of the Order of St. Anna, 3rd class
Recipients of the Order of the People's Hero
Recipients of the Order of Bravery
Heroes of the People's Republic of Bulgaria
Recipients of the Order of Georgi Dimitrov
Grand Officiers of the Légion d'honneur
Frunze Military Academy alumni
Commanders of the Legion of Merit
Recipients of the Croix de Guerre 1939–1945 (France)